North Bengal International University or NBIU is a private university established on 15 September 2013 in Matihar, Rajshahi, Bangladesh. The university was founded by Rasheda Khaleque, and founder vice chancellor of the university is Abdul Khaleque, former vice chancellor of University of Rajshahi. The university is recognised by University Grants Commission of Bangladesh.

Campus

Permanent campus
 Choddopai, Natore Road, Binodpur Bazar-6206, Motihar, Rajshahi, Bangladesh

Faculty

Undergraduate programs
 Department of Electrical and Electronic Engineering: BSC in EEE (4-Year) 146 Credit
 Department of Computer Science and Engineering: BSC in CSE (4-Year) 156 Credit
 Department of Business Studies: BBA (4-Year) 132 Credit
 Department of Law: LLB (Honors, 4-Year) 123 Credit
 Department of Communication & Journalism Studies: BSS (Honors, 4-Year) 123 Credit
 Department of Folklore & Bangladesh Studies: BSS (Honors, 4-Year) 123 Credit
 Department of Sociology: BSS (Honors, 4-Year) 123 Credit
 Department of Political Science: BSS (Honors, 4-Year) 123 Credit
 Department of English: B.A (Honors, 4-Year) 123 Credit
 Department of Bangla: B.A (Honors, 4-Year) 123 Credit
 Department of Islamic History & Culture: B.A (Honors, 4-Year) 123 Credit
 Department of Islamic Studies: B.A (Honors, 4-Year) 123 Credit

Graduate programs
 Department of Business Studies: MBA (1-Year) 36 Credit, MBA (2-Year) 63 Credit, EMBA (Executive) 48 Credit
 Department of Law: LLM (1-Year) 33 Credit, LLM (2-Year) 60 Credit
 Department of Sociology: MSS (1-Year) 33 Credit, MSS (2-Year) 60 Credit
 Department of Political Science: MSS (1-Year) 33 Credit, MSS (2-Year) 60 Credit
 Department of English: MA (1-Year) 33 Credit, MA (2-Year) 60 Credit
 Department of Bangla: MA (1-Year) 33 Credit, MA (2-Year) 60 Credit
 Department of Islamic History & Culture: MA (1-Year) 33 Credit, MA (2-Year) 60 Credit
 Department of Islamic Studies: MA (1-Year) 33 Credit, MA (2-Year) 60 Credit

Facilities
AC Classrooms with Multimedia, WiFi & Broadband Internet, Digital Sound System Conference Room, e-Library, CCTV Security System, NBIU Cafe, TSC, EEE Lab, CSE Lab, Networking Lab, Generators and others.

Extracurricular activities

Study Tour, Seminars, Debates and Contests, Competitions, Career Center, Social Awareness Activities for Deprived People, Observance of National Days and Celebrations, Picnic, Indoor/Outdoor Games, Cultural Program.

Clubs
 Cosmopolitan Business Club 
 English Language Club 
 Songskriti Chorcha Kendro 
 Justitia Law Club 
 Film Club

References

External links
 
 Details in UGC Website

Private universities in Bangladesh
Organisations based in Rajshahi
Educational institutions established in 2013
2013 establishments in Bangladesh
Education in Rajshahi